The Journal-Gazette Building is a historic commercial building located in downtown Fort Wayne, Indiana. It was designed by noted Fort Wayne architect Charles R. Weatherhogg and built in 1927–1928.  It is a four-story, 13 bay, red brick building with limestone trim in the Chicago Style. The seven central bays feature round arch window openings. For many years the building housed The Journal Gazette newspaper plant.

It was listed on the National Register of Historic Places in 1982.

References

Commercial buildings on the National Register of Historic Places in Indiana
Commercial buildings completed in 1928
Chicago school architecture in Indiana
Buildings and structures in Fort Wayne, Indiana
National Register of Historic Places in Fort Wayne, Indiana
1928 establishments in Indiana